The Women's 200 metre individual medley competition of the 2014 FINA World Swimming Championships (25 m) was held on 6 December.

Records
Prior to the competition, the existing world and championship records were as follows.

The following records were established during the competition:

Results

Heats
The heats were held at 11:51.

Final
The final was held at 19:25.

References

Women's 200 metre individual medley
2014 in women's swimming